Lancelot Hall (23 January 1915 – 26 February 1985) was an English professional footballer who made 108 appearances in the Football League playing as a left back or centre half for Barrow. He was with Barrow from 1938 to 1949, after which he retired. Before joining them, he played non-league football for Cockfield and was on the books of Luton Town without appearing for their league side.

Hall was born in Darlington, County Durham, in 1915 and died in Barrow-in-Furness, Cumbria, in 1985 at the age of 70.

References

1915 births
1985 deaths
Footballers from Darlington
English footballers
Association football defenders
Cockfield F.C. players
Luton Town F.C. players
Barrow A.F.C. players
English Football League players